Ryan Trebon (born March 5, 1981) is a retired American bicycle racer, born in Loma Linda, California. He specialized in cyclo-cross and mountain bike racing. In cyclo-cross, Trebon captured the 2004 and 2006 U.S. Gran Prix of Cyclocross series championship.

In 2006, Trebon became the first American man to claim national championships in cross-country mountain bike and cyclo-cross.

Major results 
 2014
 2nd, USA Cycling Cyclocross National Championships
 2012
 2nd, USA Cycling Cyclocross National Championships
 2011
 3rd, USA Cycling National Cross-Country Mountain Bike Championships (Short Track)
 2010
 2nd, USA Cycling Cyclocross National Championships
 3rd, USA Cycling National Cross-Country Mountain Bike Championships
 2009
 2nd, USA Cycling Cyclocross National Championships
 2008
 1st, USA Cycling Cyclocross National Championships
 2006
 1st, USA Cycling Cyclocross National Championships
 1st, USA Cycling National Cross-Country Mountain Bike Championships
 1st, Overall, U.S. Gran Prix of Cyclocross series
 1st, Whitmore's Landscaping Super Cross Cup #1, (Southampton, NY)
 1st, Gran Prix of Gloucester #1 (Gloucester, MA)
 1st, Gran Prix of Gloucester #2 (Gloucester, MA)
 1st, Xilinx Cup (Longmont, CO)
 4th, Boulder Cup (Boulder, CO)
 1st, Rad Racing Cup (Lakewood, WA)
 5th, Stumptown Cup (Portland, OR)
 10th, Superprestige Round 5: Hamme-Zogge (Hamme, Belgium)
2005
 4th, Overall, U.S. Gran Prix of Cyclocross series
 1st, Stumptown Cyclocross Classic (Portland, OR)
 2nd, Rad Racing GP of Cyclocross (Tacoma, WA)
 1st, Gran Prix of Gloucester #2 (Gloucester, MA)
2004
 1st, Overall, U.S. Gran Prix of Cyclocross series
 2nd, Gran Prix of Gloucester #1 (Gloucester, MA)
 1st, Gran Prix of Gloucester #2 (Gloucester, MA)
 1st, Beacon Cyclocross (Bridgeton, NJ)
 1st, Highland Park Cyclocross Race (Highland Park, NJ)
2003
 3rd, USA Cycling Cyclocross National Championships
 1st, North Carolina State Cyclo-cross Championship
 1st, Overall, Mid-Atlantic Cyclo-cross Series
 1st, Phrophecy Creek
 1st, Worcester Mass
 1st, Saturn Liberty Classic
 1st, Rockville Bridge Classic
 2nd, Granogue
 2nd, Highland Park
 4th, Clif Bar Grand Prix
 9th, Gran Prix of Gloucester ECV (Big Head)
 1st, Big Head Championships, Panama R.P.

See also 
 2006/07 UCI Cyclo-cross World Cup
 2006/07 Cyclo-cross Superprestige

External links 
 Kona/Les Gets Factory Team page
 Cyclocross Magazine Issue 18 Feature Story on Trebon

1981 births
Living people
American male cyclists
Cyclo-cross cyclists
Cross-country mountain bikers
People from Loma Linda, California
American mountain bikers
American cyclo-cross champions